Sfințișori (Little saints) or mucenici moldovenești (Moldavian martyrs), are traditional pastries from Romania and Moldova made to commemorate on March 9 (or March 22, as per Julian calendar), the Christian feast of the 40 Martyrs of Sebaste, a traditional holiday in Romania and Moldova.

Preparation
In the historical region of Moldavia, Sfințișori were dough in large shapes of the figure 8, baked, then smeared with honey and walnuts.

Variants
In the Muntenia and Dobruja regions of Romania, similar traditional pastries are named mucenici. The dough is smaller and boiled in water with sugar, cinnamon and crushed nuts, symbolizing the lake where the Martyrs were cast.

See also
 Mucenici
 List of pastries

Notes and references

External links 
Sfințișori
Sfințișori recipe in English

Romanian pastries
Moldovan cuisine